M. Kandaswamy Padayachi was an Indian politician and former Member of the Legislative Assembly of Tamil Nadu. He was elected to the Tamil Nadu legislative assembly as an Indian National Congress candidate from Ulundurpet constituency in 1952, 1957 and 1967 elections. A wide area in Ulundhurpet named after him as "Kandaswamypuram". The street where his descendants live was renamed to "Kandaswamy Padayachi Theru".

Kandasamy Padayachi, a rare landlord who donated his lands for Government institutions like ITI, Government School, FSCS (Co-operative Society), etc. Padayachi was a harbinger of change in governance, politics, even his personal life. Only person holds 27+ honorary posts in district.

References 

Indian National Congress politicians from Tamil Nadu
Living people
Year of birth missing (living people)